Olimpia Sztum is a football club based in Sztum, Poland.

History

Typically the club has played in the lower divisions throughout its existence. The high point of Olimpia's history was during the 2003–04 and the 2004–05 seasons. In 2003–04 the club won the regional Polish Cup for the Pomeranian region, beating Lechia Gdańsk in the final. Due to winning this competition, the club qualified for the national Polish Cup for the following season. Olimpia beat Jagiellonia Białystok in the first round to qualify for the group stage, eventually finishing third in their group and being knocked out of the competition.

Historical club names

The names the club has used throughout its history.

1946: KS Gryf Sztum
1950: MKS Gwardia Sztum
1956: LZS Sztum
1959: KS Olimpia Sztum
1964: GKS Olimpia Sztum
1972: LZS Sztum
1974: ZKP POM Sztum
1978: LKS Powiśle Czernin
1993: KP Olimpia Sztum

Honours
Regional Polish Cup, (Pomeranian region): 2003–04

References

Association football clubs established in 1946
1946 establishments in Poland
Football clubs in Pomeranian Voivodeship